Roy J. Nielsen (November 9, 1886 - August 12, 1964) served in the California State Assembly and Senate. Nielsen served in the 14th, 11th, 8th and 9th Assembly districts and served in the 19th Senate district. From 1942 to 1952, he served as Sacramento City Council. During World War I he also served in the United States Army.

References

United States Army personnel of World War I
Republican Party members of the California State Assembly
1886 births
1964 deaths
Republican Party California state senators
Sacramento City Council members
California city council members